This article is about the particular significance of the year 1875 to Wales and its people.

Incumbents

Lord Lieutenant of Anglesey – William Owen Stanley 
Lord Lieutenant of Brecknockshire – Charles Morgan, 1st Baron Tredegar (until 16 April); Joseph Bailey, 1st Baron Glanusk (from 11 June)
Lord Lieutenant of Caernarvonshire – Edward Douglas-Pennant, 1st Baron Penrhyn 
Lord Lieutenant of Cardiganshire – Edward Pryse
Lord Lieutenant of Carmarthenshire – John Campbell, 2nd Earl Cawdor 
Lord Lieutenant of Denbighshire – William Cornwallis-West  
Lord Lieutenant of Flintshire – Hugh Robert Hughes
Lord Lieutenant of Glamorgan – Christopher Rice Mansel Talbot 
Lord Lieutenant of Merionethshire – Edward Lloyd-Mostyn, 2nd Baron Mostyn
Lord Lieutenant of Monmouthshire – Henry Somerset, 8th Duke of Beaufort
Lord Lieutenant of Montgomeryshire – Sudeley Hanbury-Tracy, 3rd Baron Sudeley
Lord Lieutenant of Pembrokeshire – William Edwardes, 4th Baron Kensington
Lord Lieutenant of Radnorshire – John Walsh, 1st Baron Ormathwaite (until 21 April); Arthur Walsh, 2nd Baron Ormathwaite (from 21 April)

Bishop of Bangor – James Colquhoun Campbell
Bishop of Llandaff – Alfred Ollivant 
Bishop of St Asaph – Joshua Hughes 
Bishop of St Davids – Basil Jones

Events
August - First publication of The Usk Gleaner and Monmouthshire Record.
December - South Wales miners, led by William Abraham, come to agreement on a sliding scale of wages in relation to prices and profits.
4 December - In a mining accident at Old Pit, New Tredegar, 22 men are killed.
5 December - In a mining accident at Llan Colliery, Pentyrch, twelve men are killed.
unknown dates
The first imports of North American wheat come through Cardiff.
The United States Immigration and Naturalization Service recognises Welsh as a distinct nationality - the first official body ever to do so.
Ordnance Survey publishes the first complete maps of Wales.
David Davies Llandinam is elected treasurer of the University of Wales.
Major eisteddfod held at Pwllheli.  Future archdruid Rowland Williams (Hwfa Môn) is a leading adjudicator.
Francis Wallace Grenfell takes part in the expedition which claims Griqualand West (site of the Kimberley diamond fields) for the UK.
Bodnant Garden is begun by Baron Aberconway.

Arts and literature
Christopher Rice Mansel Talbot buys James Milo Griffith's Summer Flowers for Margam Castle.

New books

English language
Hugh Owen Thomas - Diseases of the Hip, Knee, and Ankle Joints

Welsh language
William Ambrose - Gweithiau y Parch. W. Ambrose (posthumously published)
David Stephen Davies - Adroddiad
Isaac Foulkes - Y Ddau Efell, neu Llanllonydd
Owen Jones (Meudwy Môn) (ed.) - Cymru, yn Hanesyddol, Parthedegol, a Bywgraphyddol
John Goronwy Mathias - Y Dywysen Aeddfed
Evan Rees (Dyfed) - Caniadau Dyfedfab

Music
Robert Griffiths becomes the first secretary of the tonic solfa college.
Joseph Parry composes the music to Myfanwy.
Sarah Edith Wynne marries and retires from her singing career.

Sport
Rugby union - Llanelli RFC and Risca RFC are formed.
Yachting - Bristol Channel Yacht Club is formed in Swansea.

Births
3 January - Cliff Bowen, Wales international rugby player and county cricketer (died 1929)
4 January – William Williams (Crwys), poet and Archdruid (died 1968)
19 January – Thomas Owen Jones, dramatist, actor and producer (died 1941)
23 February – David Brazell, singer (died 1959)
4 March – John Kelt Edwards, cartoonist (died 1934)
23 May – Nathaniel Walters, Wales international rugby player (died 1956)
26 May – Jack Evans Wales international rugby player (died 1947)
31 May – Dan Jones, Wales international rugby player (died 1959)
11 June – Will Osborne, Wales international rugby player (died 1942)
16 June – Henry Paget, Lord Paget, eccentric, born in Paris (died 1905)
10 September
John Evans, politician (died 1961)
Harry Vaughan Watkins, Wales international rugby player (died 1945)
26 October – Sir Lewis Casson, English-born artist (died 1969)
11 November – Johnny Jenkins, racing driver (died 1945)
20 December (in Shirley, Derbyshire) – T. F. Powys, Anglo-Welsh writer (died 1953)
25 December – George Davies, international rugby player (died 1959)

Deaths
4 January – Thomas Stephens, historian, literary critic and social reformer (born 1821)
4 March – John Evans (I. D. Ffraid), minister and author (born 1814)
April – Frances Bunsen, painter, 85
16 April – Charles Morgan, 1st Baron Tredegar, Lord Lieutenant of Brecknockshire, 83
27 July – Connop Thirlwall, former Bishop of St Davids, 78
19 August – Robert Elis (Cynddelw), writer, 63
7 September – John Prichard, minister, author and teacher, 79
29 November – Thomas Jones, librarian, 65
date unknown (in London) – Fanny Parkes, travel writer, 81

References

Wales